Hibbett is a surname. Notable people with the surname include:

David Hibbett, associate professor in biology at Clark University
Howard Hibbett (born 1920), translator and professor emeritus of Japanese literature at Harvard University
MJ Hibbett (born 1970), English guitarist singer-songwriter

See also
Hibbett Sports, publicly traded holding company for Hibbett Sporting Goods, sporting goods retailer